Eoghan Finn (born 1993) is an Irish hurler and Gaelic footballer who plays for Cork Senior Championship club St Finbarr's. He usually lines out as a left wing-forward. Finn is a former member at senior level of the Cork county team.

Career statistics

Club

Honours
Coláiste Chríost Rí
Corn Uí Mhuirí: 2011

University College Cork
All-Ireland Freshers' Hurling Championship: 2012

St. Finbarr's
Cork Premier Senior Hurling Championship: 2022
Cork Senior Football Championship: 2018

References

1993 births
Living people
UCC hurlers
St Finbarr's hurlers
St Finbarr's Gaelic footballers
Cork inter-county hurlers
Dual players